Poison arrow vine is a common name for several species of Strophanthus and may refer to:

Strophanthus eminii
Strophanthus gratus
Strophanthus hispidus
Strophanthus preussii
Strophanthus sarmentosus

References